This is a list of characters from the Clannad universe, including the visual novel, manga, and anime of the same name.

Main characters

Voiced by: Kentaro Ito (DVD bundled with PS2 game), Yūichi Nitta (Tomoyo After: It's a Wonderful Life, RPG mode only), Kenji Nojima (drama CD, movie), Yūichi Nakamura (anime, Tomoyo After), David Matranga (English)
Tomoya is the main character of the Clannad visual novel. He is a student at Hikarizaka high school, and is referred to as a delinquent who frequently arrives to school late and skips classes, but not as someone who starts fights. His mother, Atsuko, died in a car crash when he was young. Since then, Tomoya has been living with his father, Naoyuki. They argue constantly, and Tomoya's dream of playing professional basketball ended when he injured his shoulder during a fight with his father.

Throughout the visual novel Tomoya is presented with, and solves, many of his friends' problems. He is a childhood friend of Kotomi Ichinose and is best friends with Youhei Sunohara. At the beginning of the visual novel, Tomoya meets Nagisa Furukawa, who becomes his good friend, and later his girlfriend/wife.

In After Story, Tomoya becomes an electrician after graduating from high school. He marries Nagisa, and they have a daughter named Ushio. Tomoya takes care of Nagisa as she grows ill during her pregnancy, but she dies after giving birth. Tomoya becomes depressed and leaves Ushio's care to Akio and Sanae. Later, Tomoya realizes that he's putting Ushio through the same kind of relationship he and his father had and soon becomes a better father.  After Ushio dies, Tomoya realizes that Ushio is the Girl in the Illusionary World. He then uses light orbs to turn back the hands of time to the day that Nagisa is in labor, and prevents both her and Ushio from dying. In the end, Tomoya lives with his daughter and wife as a peaceful family.

Nagisa is the main heroine. She is an auburn-haired girl who is shy, sensitive and uses a non-confrontational style of speech. Her birthday is December 24. She shouts the names of food that she plans to eat as a way to motivate herself, such as anpan, a type of sweet bean bread. Due to an illness that lasted nine months, she was forced to repeat her final year; as such, she is a year older than her classmates which caused them to bully or alienate her. Nagisa nearly died as a child due to her parents' preoccupation with their careers since she has periodically suffered long bouts of illness since the age of five. Nagisa's life was spared, however, after her parents abandoned their dreams, and open a bakery to watch over Nagisa's health. Despite not having many friends, Nagisa is a caring person. She would not hesitate to assist a stranger. As a result, Tomoya criticizes her at times for being naïve; nevertheless, she is always kind to him and cares about him a lot. Nagisa's wish of reviving the school's drama club is the priority of Tomoya's efforts, even with the encounters with the other heroines. When Nagisa reaches her goal, she shows a considerable amount of growth since she met Tomoya. The following day, Tomoya confesses his love to Nagisa. She accepts it and the two begin their relationship as a couple.

In After Story, she succumbs to her illness that she has to repeat her third-year yet again. She manages to continue attending school every day and dons a brave smile throughout the year. When Tomoya leaves the bakery to move into his own apartment, Nagisa visits him almost every day and cooks meals for him, keeping him company. When winter comes, her illness forces her absent at the graduation ceremony; Tomoya organizes a mock ceremony for her in graduation. Soon after, she and Tomoya marry. Along with Rie and Sugisaka, Nagisa begins as a waitress at a family restaurant. Eventually, Nagisa becomes pregnant, and she and Tomoya decide to name their child Ushio, Nagisa enters her final months of pregnancy, and successfully gives birth to her daughter, Ushio; however, she dies shortly after childbirth.

Both Nagisa and Ushio are eventually resurrected when Tomoya wishes for a miracle to turn back time. Despite deciding to avoid his first meeting with Nagisa, in order to change their fate, he finds he cannot let Nagisa go. By calling out to her again, he proves he doesn't regret meeting her, and the delivery goes well, allowing both Nagisa and Ushio to survive.

Kyou is another heroine that plays a supporting role in the adaptations. Kyou is the older one of the purple-haired Fujibayashi twins and has long hair with her hairpiece to the left. She assumed the role of class representative of her class, but generally does not consider it very important. An exception to this is when she hides the fact that she commutes to school on a scooter, which is prohibited by the school. She is an aggressive girl who can sometimes be overprotective of her sister. She shown to be quite physically strong. Kyou becomes a member of the drama club, although she only signs up so the minimum number of members will be reached. While working so that Ryou and Tomoya become a couple, Kyou falls in love with Tomoya too. However, after seeing Tomoya helping Nagisa when she got injured, the two sisters hugged and cried as they came to grips with the reality that Tomoya is already in love with Nagisa.

Later in After Story, Kyou works as a kindergarten teacher, and coincidentally is also Ushio's teacher. According to Tomoya, her personality is still the same even after the reunion, but Ushio says that Kyou is a good teacher. She misses Nagisa and is often reminded of her each time she sees Ushio. Kyou also appeared in the movie adaptation, as a member of the school council and assistant to Tomoyo with a close relationship.

Kotomi is a childhood friend of Tomoya, but, like Kyou, she is in the same year and in a separate class from Tomoya. She is a blue-haired studious girl who is in the top ten for every subject throughout the whole country in standardized exam results—she always goes to the library to read extra materials, especially books in foreign languages. Kotomi is a tacit girl and it is quite difficult to communicate with her. In her spare time, she plays the violin, although she is very poor at it to the point of causing pain to those who hear her play.

Tomoya meets her but does not remember that they were once good friends until a bus crash causes her to break down in front of everyone. Tomoya visits her in her house and realizes they lost contact with each other after Kotomi's parents died in a plane crash. Not wanting to feel the pain of losing someone important anymore, she asks Tomoya to leave her alone. Wanting to bring Kotomi away from her past, Tomoya decides to renovate her garden, while the drama club members decide to gift her a violin, which is unfortunately destroyed. Kotomi confesses to Tomoya that she had been in love with him ever since he has entered her life. The next day, her guardian presents Kotomi her parents' briefcase that has traveled all the way to Japan, and inside is a teddy bear and a testimony, asking Kotomi to live the way she wants and grow up to be an adult. Kotomi realizes she is still being loved by her parents even after their death and cries. After this, Kotomi becomes happy, and the drama club members finally give Kotomi a violin for her birthday.

In the anime adaptation Clannad After Story, Kotomi moves to America to further her studies about the illusionary world. She, however, occasionally visits Tomoya and the others. Kotomi also appeared in the movie adaptation, only being a background character as she is only seen conducting a song for the members of the Choir Club.

, Ryōko Tanaka (Tomoyo After)
Tomoyo transferred to Hikarizaka high school as a second-year student during spring. She is a silver-haired strong-silent type girl who is known to be very strong. Although Tomoya is older than she is, she does not show him his due respect as a senior student. She has a younger brother named .

In Tomoyo's path, she is rumored to be violent and to have a record for fighting. These rumors are later confirmed, when she beats up several delinquents from her previous school at a day during school hours. After several meetings with Tomoyo, Tomoya learns from her that she wants to be a student council president, and later, her reason for wanting to do so is that she wants to get enough influence to start a movement to prevent a row of cherry blossom trees from being cut down by development plans. Cherry trees have a special meaning to her since they helped mend her broken Sakagami family and turn her away from delinquency. When rumors of her former delinquency continue to spread and threaten to derail her campaign to be student council president, Tomoya helps her out by arranging for her to challenge the various sports teams, all of which she manages to win, thus greatly increasing her popularity. This in turn allows her to win student council president.

She ends up secretly going out with Tomoya. News of her relationship with him spreads fast in school, and the teachers and fellow student council members try to separate the two in hopes that Tomoyo will concentrate more on her position as student council president and strive to achieve the greater heights they believe she is capable of. Tomoya, worrying about his delinquent status, reluctantly breaks up with her out of fear that he will hold her back. After several months, Tomoyo meets up with Tomoya once again, telling him that she successfully saved the cherry blossom trees from being cut down but she lost something in return: her time with him. Tomoya is touched by her words and they both decide to resume being lovers. After Tomoya graduates in spring, he sees both Takafumi and Tomoyo off to school, with both of them admiring the beauty of the cherry blossom.  Tomoyo's story continues in Tomoyo After: It's a Wonderful Life, Key's fifth game and spin-off sequel to Clannad, with her as the main heroine. In the movie, Tomoyo is also running for student council president, but gets the position much faster and doesn't interact with Tomoya very much. She is shown to become close with him and his friends and her relationships with Kyou and Youhei are better compared to the game and anime. She and Youhei show up at Tomoya's apartment during his bout of depression after Nagisa's death in an attempt to try cheering him up.

Fuko is a first-year student at Hikarizaka high school. Her birthday is in July. She is a mysterious girl who is always alone, making wood carvings of starfish with a small knife to give to others as presents. This hobby occupies her completely to the point that she sometimes loses awareness of her surroundings. Tomoya meets Fuko in an empty classroom, carving a block of wood with a knife. Tomoya confiscates the knife after noticing she is hurting herself but returns the knife the next day. Some days later, Tomoya learns from Fuko that she is carving 700 starfish to be distributed to all the students in the school, wanting them to attend her sister Kouko's wedding. The main problem is that no one in the school, except for Nagisa, knows about Kouko because she stopped teaching at the school three years ago. After learning about Fuko's current physical state, due to a traffic accident and her existence as an ikiryō, or astral projection, both Nagisa and Tomoya decide to assist Fuko to achieve her dreams by giving all the students a carved starfish; including Fuko's friend Mitsui before she had the accident.

As the story progresses, Fuko starts to disappear from everyone's memories, due to her waning spiritual power, as the real Fuko had stopped breathing in the hospital. Determined to fulfill Fuko's dream and make Kouko's wedding happen, Tomoya asks Koumura-sensei to organize the wedding ceremony on May 18. Through many struggles and hardships, Kouko's wedding turns into a success Mitsui and all of the students who were given a starfish carving attend the wedding. After the wedding, Fuko thanks Tomoya for everything he did and congratulates her sister before disappearing. After the wedding, Kouko and Yusuke decide to thank Fuko in her hospital room.

Fuko's personality is hyperactive and childish, causing most people who don't know her to believe that she is a grade school student. She is judgmental towards Tomoya; often calling him a weird guy but is secretly dependent on him. Due to her dependency on Tomoya, she has grown to love him and finally proves her feelings to Tomoya by kissing him on the cheek.  In the After Story arc, through a miracle from one of Tomoya's light orbs, Fuko recovers from her coma. She becomes incredibly fond of Ushio, claiming that she'll kidnap Ushio from Tomoya in order to make Ushio her little sister. In Clannads epilogue, she is seen coming across the Girl in the Illusionary World (who turns into Ushio) sleeping in the clearing where Nagisa had been saved from death so many years ago, asking her to play with her. In the After Story arc, Fuko occasionally appears in various unexpected situations; this is actually a nod to the Fuko Ninja event in the game that happens in Tomoyo's path, after completing the entire game.

Ushio is Tomoya and Nagisa's daughter. She appears prominently in the After Story, and in the film. Ushio resembles her mother a lot and ikes the Big Dango Family as well. After giving birth to her, Nagisa dies. This deeply saddens Tomoya to the point he gave up raising Ushio and left her to the care of Akio and Sanae. Tomoya resorts to alcohol and cigarettes to ease depression.

Five years later, Sanae arranges a trip to a flower field for Tomoya and Ushio in hopes that they will be together again. During the trip, Tomoya meets his grandmother, Shino, and learns about his father's past and the sacrifices he made for Tomoya, which leads him to regret his actions and decide to raise Ushio and acknowledge Naoyuki as his father. Ushio reconciles with her father, Tomoya, when she lost a toy robot the first thing her father ever brought for her. Ushio is revealed to be a student at Kyou's kindergarten school. Shortly after Tomoya sets things right, Ushio is stricken with the same disease as Nagisa. Despite the efforts and sacrifices of Tomoya, Akio, and Sanae, Ushio's fever never subsides but worsens. In the coming Christmas winter, being filled with the desperation of wanting to do anything for Ushio, Tomoya brings her for another trip, but she falls unconscious and dies shortly thereafter along with her father who succumbed to his grief, with her last breath being "Daddy I love you". Ushio is then revealed to be The Girl in the Illusionary World of her parents' dreams. Desperate to save her family from a cruel fate, she created the world to meet Tomoya again, to collect light orbs to make a miracle possible. If enough light orbs are gathered, Ushio instead lives a happy life with her parents and does not suffer from her mother's sickness. In the epilogue, Ushio is shown sleeping under the same tree where Akio begged for Nagisa's life to be saved, found by Fuko saying "the fun is just getting started."

In the movie, after seeing Tomoya so depressed, his father asks his friends to take him to a train station where he meets with Ushio. It's hinted that he will stay with her and not end up like his father.

Secondary characters

Youhei is Tomoya's friend and also a delinquent. He entered the school on an athletic recommendation in soccer, but was kicked out of the soccer club after being involved in a fight with other members who had a tendency of harassing the younger players. After this incident, he became lazy, becoming the only student with a higher absence rate than Tomoya. He is left-handed when it comes to sports and fighting, but he writes with his right hand, hinting that he is ambidextrous. He and Tomoya are known as the "Dirty Pair" in school. His hair is naturally black, but he bleached it blond after joining the soccer club. He is highly protective to his sister Mei when they were younger. One of the story paths involves him repairing his relationship with his sister. Youhei often gets punished or beaten up by various characters due to his obnoxious behavior, most notably by Kyou and Tomoyo.

Youhei plays a major role in some character paths, most notably the one revolving around him and his sister. In the After Story arc, he is inspired into becoming a model, and by the request of Tomoya, attends Nagisa's fake graduating ceremony. He also visits Nagisa when she is pregnant. According to the scriptwriters, he has the most appearances in the School Life arc.

In the movie, while Youhei remains the central comic relief character, he is also depicted as being somewhat more serious about life, such as when he gets a part-time job to help his family through their tough financial situation. He also gets along much better with Tomoyo, and actively tries along with her to get Tomoya out of the deep depression he'd gone into after losing Nagisa.

Yukine is a second year student who hangs around in the library's reference room during lunchtime. Tomoya first met her in the library's reference room while trying to find a "how to" book about speeches for Nagisa. He is immediately greeted by her hospitality, and returns the next day with Youhei due to Youhei's insistence. Ever since, Tomoya, Nagisa, and Youhei start to enter the library reference room routinely. She later avails Tomoya and Youhei an instruction book for magical spells for them to try. Most of them are in the favor of Tomoya, involving the girls they met.

She has friends outside of her school, which turns out to be delinquents from other schools. She made friends with the delinquents through her brother, Kazuto, who is also a delinquent, after his death trying to save a friend from an accident. Tomoya learns briefly about the legend of the light orbs through Yukine, which are called the "symbol of happiness". The light orbs are actually the Girl's wishes in the Illusionary World.

According to the script writers, Yukine was originally intended to be one of the main heroines of Clannad, but as her story did not reach their expectations, she was made into a secondary character. However, she was still depicted on the regular edition cover of the PC release, and on the PlayStation 2 release which used the same art as the regular PC release.

Ryou is Tomoya's classmate and class representative. She is the younger one of the Fujibayashi twins. Unlike Kyou, she is timid and does not cook well (but is otherwise good at chores). She is very keen about fortune telling, but her predictions, while incredibly specific, always manage to be either somewhat skewed or extremely wrong. Ryou plays as a major supporting character in both Kyou's path and Kappei's path.

Ryou has a crush on Tomoya, as shown in Kyou's arc, and needs Kyou's help on pursuing Tomoya. In Kappei's arc, she pursues Kappei instead, which worries Kyou. Ryou has her own optional path, where Tomoya pursues Ryou and become boyfriend and girlfriend, however it is considered as Kyou's bad end. Later, Kyou finally admits that she's in love with Tomoya; this leads Tomoya to break up with Ryou because he realized that he was really in love with Kyou. Kyou then cut her hair in sacrifice to hurting her sister, but Ryou assured her that it was okay, and that she couldn't help who she fell in love with. Ryou takes nursing course and as a nurse in the anime adaption Clannad After Story. Her job as a nurse is further proven, seen in Kappei's path five years later, where she works as a nurse, at the end of the story.

Misae Sagara is the resident manager at Youhei's all-boys dorm. She was Hikarizaka's first female student council president when she was in high school. She achieved a full week of perfect attendance for the whole student body and she was loved by the students. Misae is friendly with the dorm students but strict when it comes to the dorm rules. She is also well liked by the rugby members. Depending on decisions, Tomoya can change her to a violent dorm lady through his lecture.

When Misae was young, she fell in love with a boy and hopes that one day she'll see him again. It's later revealed though that the stray cat she takes care of is actually the true form of the boy she is waiting for. When Tomoya tries to pursue Misae, the cat gives Tomoya a dream about Misae's past. When Misae was still in high school, she had two friends Saki and Yuki, and a guy named Igarashi that she liked. One day, Misae meets a boy who introduced himself as "Katsuki Shima" and insisted on granting her wish as a payment for encouraging him to recover. Misae's reluctance on giving him a wish to be granted and the boy's persistence cause them to spend time together, eventually leading into the development of mutual romantic feelings, especially after it is revealed that Igarashi already has a girlfriend. However, the boy realizes that his true identity is not Katsuki, but Katsuki's cat: before dying, Katsuki gave the cat the duty of granting Misae a wish. To satisfy Katsuki's continual attempts to grant her a wish, Misae asks for him to love her forever and ever. Having succeeded in his quest, the cat is returned to his original form without Misae's knowledge, leading her to believe Katsuki has disappeared. Meanwhile, she adopts what appears to her to be nothing more than a stray cat. At the town's autumn festival, Tomoya tells Misae about her cat's true identity.

Yusuke is an electrician who once attended Hikarizaka high school and lived as a rock musician. Tomoya first met Yusuke during a street light accident involving a person's car, and assists Yusuke in his work. Yusuke is engaged to Kouko, and is also one of the reasons why Fuko exists in the school. He marries Kouko in the middle of the School Life arc and first season of the anime.

He plays a more prominent role in After Story, giving Tomoya a job as an assistant electrician at the Hikarizaka Electrical Company he works at, and on occasion, words of advice. He has an odd quirk of sometimes randomly saying dramatic and often strange or incoherent phrases. Due to Tomoya's interest in him, Yusuke tells him of his past - how he became a rock musician, rose in fame, and then subsequently broke down after receiving news that one of his fans committed a crime. He became overcome with stress and despair, which affected his music and eventually caused him to turn to drugs. After being rehabilitated, no one wanted him anymore except for Kouko, who had encouraged him to become a rock musician during his high school days. Throwing away his past, he now works as an electrician. Realizing that there are people who still love his music through Tomoya, Yusuke decides to create another music CD that sings his love for the city in which he resides.

In the movie, he is Tomoya and Youhei's employer. Yusuke is introduced in the movie trying to encourage Tomoya to come back to work, and he gives Youhei a part time job. He also plays a major part in facilitating Tomoya's reunion with his daughter in order to snap him out of his depression.

Kouko is Fuko's older sister. She used to be an art teacher at Hikarizaka high school, and she treats everyone kindly. Kouko is one of the familiar faces in the Furukawa Bakery, and Nagisa admires her very much, being her former art teacher. Currently she is engaged with Yusuke Yoshino, and is the major reason why Fuko still exists in the school, despite the fact she's still in a coma at the hospital. Thanks to Fuko's efforts she does eventually marries Yusuke. After the marriage, she is now known as Kouko Yoshino'''. In the After-story arc, she reappears when Fuko is finally released from the hospital.

In the movie, Kouko is one of the teachers for second year students instead of an art teacher, and is depicted as still working for the school, eventually becoming the supervisor for the drama club. She, along with Youhei and Tomoya helps revive the drama club for Nagisa.

Toshio Koumura is a language teacher at Hikarizaka high school and Tomoya's home room teacher during his first year. His age conceals his once vigorous past marked by his enthusiasm in teaching. He was friends with Kouko Ibuki three years ago.

Five years ago, he was a strict teacher in an engineering school, well known for changing a lot of delinquents in the school for the better, but at Tomoya's school, his skill is not needed due to the prestigious image of the school. It was because of him that Tomoya and Youhei ran into each other in the first place, and it's heavily implied that he deliberately arranged them to do so, knowing that if they had at least one good friend, they'd have a reason to keep going to school and not drop out. He retires one year later, prior to the end of the school segment of the story. In After Story, he returns and organizes the fake graduating ceremony intended for Nagisa, arranged by Tomoya.

Kappei is a mysterious nineteen-year-old young man who is traveling around. His goal in life is "to live like a man". Tomoya will meet Kappei if he chooses to avoid Kyou's scooter on the right side. Kyou intends to hit Tomoya as a revenge for Botan running back home wet, but hits Kappei instead. While stunned, a kind girl helped him recover before leaving quickly. Unbeknownst to her, she left her handkerchief behind.

Kappei's goal is to find a job and to find the kind person that he met with after the crash. The kind person turns out to be Ryou, and through her he finds a job at the hospital. Both of them start to become intimate ever since. However, it was revealed that he had osteosarcoma, a cancer which he carried since he was young, causing him to be hospitalized and is also revealed to have once been a prodigious athlete for his school.

Kappei refuses to have his legs amputated even though it would cause him to die because he could not bear not being able to run, but is convinced out of it by (mainly) Ryou and Tomoya, who were encouraged after having received advice from Yusuke. Ryou manages to convince him (one of the methods she uses is threatening him by getting pregnant with his baby while he sleeps, which proves just how deeply she cares for Kappei) to get cured. Ryou also informs Kappei that a new technique of treatment using liquid nitrogen would not require an amputation. This encouraged him and he finally decided to take the operation. Five years later, Tomoya visits the hospital again to see Kappei (who is in therapy for recovery), and Ryou, working as a nurse in the hospital, guides him to Kappei's room where he greets him with a nostalgic line. Kappei eventually marries Ryou Fujibayashi happily two years after they first met.

Kappei is the only character in the visual novel who does not appear in any of the animated versions of Clannad.

Families

Naoyuki is Tomoya's father. His wife, Atsuko Okazaki, died when Tomoya was young, thus leaving only himself to raise Tomoya. After the accident, Naoyuki turned to alcohol and gambling, and had strict fights with his son. One day while arguing with his son on trivial things, he slammed Tomoya against the wall, dislocating Tomoya's right shoulder. Immediately after that, Tomoya went to the hospital; it was declared to be untreatable. Ever since then, Naoyuki has treated Tomoya more kindly, but like a stranger rather than family. This only hurt Tomoya even more, so he becomes a delinquent, as he is unable to participate in basketball activities any longer, and he avoided returning to his home early enough to be confronted with his father. Tomoya has the intention of running away from his home, as revealed from Kotomi's path. After moving in at Nagisa's house, Naoyuki came to see her play, much to the surprise of Tomoya.

In the After Story, Naoyuki is put in prison due to some problems. This prevents Tomoya from ascending in his job, and he visits his father in prison. He visits him again later to tell him that he is going to marry Nagisa, to which his father consents. Five years later, as revealed from Shino's story about Naoyuki, even though his wife Atsuko died and he had become depressed, Naoyuki sacrificed everything in his life just for Tomoya's sake, hoping Tomoya to grow up to be a proper man unlike him. Tomoya finally understand what his father was going through and decides to forgive him, admitting that he indeed was a good parent. After Tomoya comes to terms with his father, Naoyuki decides to return to his hometown to stay with his mother, claiming his role as a father has finally come to an end.

In the movie, Naoyuki is shown to work a graveyard shift with hardly any time to come home, instead of staying home and becoming a drunk and gambling addict (though it's clear that he did still have a tendency to copiously drink while Tomoya was growing up, hence leading into their estranged relationship). He's also depicted as being more consciously aware of his actions and more actively trying to repair his relationship with Tomoya, going out of his way to have a talk with Tomoya and even contacting Tomoya's friends and family to orchestrate a trip for Tomoya so he can spend time with his daughter Ushio, in order prevent his son from becoming like him.

Shino is Tomoya's grandmother on his father's side. She only appears in the After Story portion of the plot. During Ushio's path, when Ushio is finding her toy robot she lost in the flower field, Tomoya meets Shino at the edge of the cape, who introduces herself to him and their meeting is planned by Sanae. Shino tells the story about Naoyuki's past and tragedy after Atsuko's death, which is similar to what Tomoya is facing after Nagisa's death, along with his sacrifices made for Tomoya just to see him grow up to be a proper man. After listening to Shino's recounting of his father's story, Tomoya feels deep remorse for having neglected his daughter, and for how he'd treated his father who he now realizes had loved him all along, and decides to mend his relationship between himself, Ushio and his father. Shino tells Tomoya to relay a message to Naoyuki that she wants him to return home so she can be with him, which Naoyuki agrees to after finally making amends with Tomoya.

Akio is Nagisa's father and the husband of Sanae Furukawa. He looks deceptively younger and is shown to be an avid smoker. Although he often talks and plays rough (in addition to having a reckless personality) he is kind and sympathetic. His child-like side makes it easy for kids and adults alike to befriend him. He runs the Furukawa Bakery with his wife Sanae. Akio shows how much he is in love with his wife, and how much he cares for her too. In his spare time, Akio plays baseball with children in the small park next to the bakery, and indulges in the Gundam and Star Wars fandoms. He is often the victim of Sanae's bread, frequently insulting her bread while unaware she is actually in the room, and consequently having to eat the bread in front of her while claiming that he loves it in order to pacify her hurt feelings.

During the School Life arc, it's revealed Akio had been a talented aspiring actor in a theatrical company, but had to quit his job due to Nagisa's health. Akio replaces Youhei's role as the comic relief during the After Story arc, however, he can be serious when needed, as he often gives advice to Tomoya on what it is like to be an adult and a father. He tells Tomoya the story about how Nagisa almost died due to his and Sanae's unintended negligence. Nagisa had been sick with a fever, but because Akio and Sanae were unable to get time off from work, they left her home alone. When Akio came back to check on her, he'd found her collapsed outside in the snow, as she had attempted to go outside to wait for her parents to come home. Desperate, he ran through the town while holding Nagisa and crying, praying that she wouldn't die. When he came upon a clearing, a light shown and seemingly miraculously, Nagisa woke up. Akio expresses a belief that after she was saved, Nagisa's health became connected to the town.

Sanae is Nagisa's mother. Normally she's very childish and a cry-baby, but when needed she can be very strong-willed and dependable. She runs the Furukawa Bakery with her husband Akio. She often tries out strange concepts to make breads that are anything but edible, and almost never get sold. Outside of the bakery, she tutors children. She looks extremely young compared to her actual age, frequently being mistaken for being Nagisa's older sister instead of her mother, and even being able to pass as a high school student if she dresses a certain way.

Sanae plays a larger role in After Story, often comes to Tomoya's aid when Nagisa is sick and needs to be accompanied, especially during Nagisa's pregnancy. Before being a baker at the Furukawa Bakery, she was a middle school teacher, and had to quit her job due to Nagisa's health. Sanae is the mastermind behind Tomoya and Ushio's trip to the flower cape, in hope for them to reconcile. She knows Shino, Tomoya's grandmother in his father's side, although it is never revealed how they met. She also pretended to Youhei's girlfriend to show his sister Mei that he does have a future but Mei finds out that he is pretending.

In the movie, instead of being a teacher, it is said that she was also an actor and was in the same acting troupe as Akio, before having to quit in order taking care of Nagisa.

Mei is Youhei's younger sister who loves Youhei as a brother and lives in the countryside. Mei is a smart girl and likes to see new things. She is a fan of Yusuke Yoshino. Worried about her brother's situation, she calls Youhei, but instead of her brother, Tomoya disguised as Youhei tells her to come.

Mei's personality is a direct opposite of that of her brother, Youhei. She can be very nosy about things, like trying to further Tomoya's relationship with Nagisa by becoming their cupid angel or learning Youhei's current situation. Although Youhei tries to avoid Mei, he still cares for her, as seen when he stands up for her when she gets bullied by the soccer club in Sunohara sibling's path. The two siblings eventually grow closer as a result.

Illusionary world

The only human in the illusionary world, a world that both Nagisa and Tomoya have dreams of, and is the basis for the play Nagisa puts on after successfully reinstating the drama club. The girl creates a body out of junk for an unnamed entity only referred to as "I", so that she will not be alone anymore. At the edge of death after failing to get away from the world, it is revealed that she is actually Ushio who had lost her memory after dying in the real world, regaining it just long enough to inform the junk robot that they have a linked past and that he is actually her father, Tomoya. She created the Illusionary World in order to collect enough lights to make a miracle possible and save her family from their tragic fate, although she holds no recollection of this. In Clannad's epilogue, she is shown sleeping under the tree where Akio had once begged for Nagisa's life long ago, and is apparently seen for a brief instant by Fuko, though it turns out to be the real Ushio.

He has no name, but narrates the situation in the Illusionary world seen through Tomoya's dream while referring to himself only as "I". His body was created by the girl in the illusionary world out of junk so that she wouldn't be alone. The body is about half the girl's height. He can't talk, as he had been created without a mouth, so relies on body language to communicate with the girl. When on the edge of death in the illusion, the girl is revealed to be Ushio, and she informs the robot that he is her father, Tomoya, and tells him to collect light orbs to create a miracle that will save their family from the tragedy that had befallen them. He later succeeds in doing this.

In the anime, he is sent back into the past, where his past self (with memories of the bad future) reasons that if he had never met Nagisa, neither of them would have suffered, and seems about to change history so that they never stopped to talk to each other. But then he and his 'other self' (the junk robot) become one mentally, and ultimately they decide to meet Nagisa, who also remembers the future, and had hoped that he wouldn't regret meeting her. After this, they wake up in a world where Nagisa survives.

Other charactersVoiced by: Chisako Tatsumi (game), Mai Aizawa (drama CD, series), Rozie Curtis (English)
Rie is a second-year student at Hikarizaka Private High School who used to play the violin as a child, and won many competitions. She had a lot of talent and was supposed to go to study abroad, but she was involved in an accident. As a result, her grip became weak and she was unable to play the violin as well as she had previously been able to, having lost her main aim in life. However, when she entered high school, Toshio Koumura taught her about chorus, and she discovered that she could sing very well. Thus, having discovered a new reason to live on, she decided to form a chorus club with her friends. Her best friend is her fellow club member Sugisaka. Kotomi befriends with her when Rie lend her violin to her. Rie wishes to go to music school after graduation.

Rie attends Nagisa's fake graduation ceremony, and starts working at a family restaurant with Sugisaka as waitresses, where she eventually gets Nagisa to work at too.Voiced by: Ai Bandō (Japanese), Lesley Tesh (Clannad English dub), Jessica Boone (Clannad After Story English dub)
Sugisaka is a member of the Choir Club. She appears when Nagisa asks the Choir Club if they could have Toshio Koumura as their advisor. Sugisaka actively refuses, and even threatens to hurt Nagisa if she tries to establish the Theater Club. Youhei, Tomoya, and Nagisa eventually confront her after school. Sugisaka later explains that Rie used to play the violin well when she was little, but got into an accident. When Rie went to high school, she and her friends formed the Choir Club since Rie always looked lonely, and because Rie could still sing. She then begs Nagisa to not get in her way, but Youhei calls Sugisaka a cheater for trying to get their sympathy. She appears with Rie to watch Youhei, Tomoya and Kyou go against the Basketball Team. When Tomoya and the rest won the match, Sugisaka relented and reached a compromise with Nagisa: they would share Koumura as an advisor for their clubs.

Sugisaka and Rie attend Nagisa's graduation. She is seen working with Rie and Nagisa in a family restaurant as waitresses.

Katsuki only appears during Misae's arc, which explains the events which happened to her some years prior to the beginning of the Clannad storyline. He was Misae's boyfriend for a while. It is revealed that Katsuki is a boy who Misae met in the past while he was in a wheelchair in the hospital. Her kind words encouraged him to recover. Years later, he searches for her with the hopes of paying her back. We discover that he is not the real Katsuki Shima, because the real Katsuki died, but not having been able to thank Misae and grant her wish, he entrusted this mission to his cat, who took a human form. During the main Clannad'' series, we can see the cat often accompanying Misae around.

The unnamed gentleman is a strange man who in Kotomi's arc one day approaches her out on the street. One day as Tomoya is out by himself, he sees the man outside Kotomi's house and approaches the man, asking who he is. The gentleman answers that he used to be one of Kotomi's parents' colleagues, and that there's something important he has to talk to Kotomi about. He tells Tomoya a complicated story about the Ichinoses' research and their scientific discoveries. Tomoya learns about Kotomi's past in the Illusionary World, he finds out that the gentleman is actually Kotomi's official guardian and godfather, as her parents died in a plane crash several years earlier. The man they all thought was a bad guy was actually trying to give her the birthday gift she was promised as a little girl, a teddy bear.

Yu is a young boy who first appears in Yukine's arc. He is first seen "arm locking" Yukine because his sister is at Kazuto's gang. After calming down, Yu tells Yukine that his 21-year-old sister ran away after a fight with their mom. Yukine tells him that she would help him find his sister and speak to the gang. Yu is very grateful for this. After reuniting with his sister, Yu is seen later with Youhei (impersonating Kazuto), who is teaching to be a man.

Atsuko is Tomoya's late mother. She died in a traffic accident when Tomoya was too young to remember her, leaving Naoyuki, his father, to raise him alone. Atsuko and Naoyuki got married while still in high school. Her appearance seems to resemble that of Nagisa. In the After Story, when Shino tells Tomoya the story about Atsuko and Naoyuki, he finally understands his position of being a father for Ushio.

 
Kazuto is the deceased brother of Yukine Miyazawa. He was a delinquent, but was kind to his sister. He was not on good terms with his parents. His appearance resembles Youhei, and his personality is like Tomoya. It is said that he was the only person who could take on Tomoyo in a one-on-one fight. Kazuto is revealed to be leader of a gang of delinquents. They were up against another gang and their leader, Sasaki, fighting over territory.

He died in a car accident escorting his friends' home. No one else knew this because Yukine and her brother's gang didn't want the word out to their rival gang that their leader is dead. When everyone learns the truth, they instead decide to end the rivalry, which Kazuto wished for. Yukine, Nagisa, and Tomoya, along with both gangs, visit his grave.

Botan is Kyou's pet baby boar, and is a comic relief character. Botan will sometimes go to Kyou's school just to see her. Due to her small size and the fact that she is a baby boar, she is sometimes captured by several characters who talk of eating her. In the After Story, Botan has become an adult boar, but still acts the same. Botan has seven different skills, one of them being able to take the appearance of a stuffed animal by being extremely still. Other skills shown in the visual novel include Rugby Ball; Botan assumes the shape of a rugby ball for Kyou to use and throw (at Tomoya) instead of a dictionary, Pillow; a softer appearance of a stuffed animal, and Massage; Botan self-vibrates. At Kyou's kindergarten school, Botan is loved by Ushio and the kids.

References

External links
Official Clannad visual novel character profiles 

Characters
Lists of anime and manga characters
Clannad